Christopher J. Rogers (October 6, 1924 - October 29, 1976) was a Canadian Horse Racing Hall of Fame  jockey about whom the great U.S. Racing Hall of Fame inductee Eddie Arcaro called "one of the most complete riders he had ridden against or watched." According to the Canadian Horse Racing Hall of Fame, "Many horsemen consider Rogers the best jockey produced in Canada."

Rogers won his first race on his very first try on Bon Marche at  Fort Erie Race Track in 1941  and went on to win 2,043 races in his career including numerous important graded stakes races in Canada. He won that country's most prestigious race, the Queen's Plate, three times: with Epic in 1949, McGill in 1950 and Cosllisteo in 1954. In 1958 Rogers guided longshot Lincoln Road to victory in the Jersey Derby and to second place finishes in the Kentucky Derby and the Preakness Stakes behind the future U.S. Hall of Fame colt, Tim Tam.

Chris Rogers died of lung cancer in 1976 and the following year was inducted in Canadian Horse Racing Hall of Fame. In 1988 he was also recognized with the Avelino Gomez Memorial Award for his significant contributions to the sport of horse racing.

References
Chris Rogers at the Canadian Horse Racing Hall of Fame

Sports Illustrated Articles

Read about Lincoln Road's finish in the Kentucky Derby, p. 106

1924 births
1976 deaths
Canadian jockeys
Canadian Horse Racing Hall of Fame inductees
Avelino Gomez Memorial Award winners
Deaths from lung cancer
Sportspeople from Hamilton, Ontario
Canadian expatriate sportspeople in the United States